Alburnus selcuklui is a species of ray-finned fish in the genus Alburnus from the headwaters of the Tigris in eastern Anatolia, Turkey.

References

selcuklui
Taxa named by Müfit Özuluǧ
Fish described in 2015